The 1989 Summer Universiade, also known as the XV Summer Universiade, took place in Duisburg, West Germany.

Sports

Venues

Medal table

GB Fencing coach / manager team Dr Ronald Moore

 
1989
U
Sport in Duisburg
U
U
Multi-sport events in West Germany
Summer Universiade
1980s in North Rhine-Westphalia
Sports competitions in North Rhine-Westphalia